Elimia lachryma is a species of freshwater snail with an operculum, an aquatic gastropod mollusk in the family Pleuroceridae. The species is endemic to the State of Alabama in the United States.

As of 2000, the species was considered extinct by the IUCN. It was rediscovered in the wild in 2005, but is still considered critically imperiled.

References 

lachryma
Gastropods described in 1861
Taxonomy articles created by Polbot